Fred Roger Pontare (born Roger Johansson; 17 October 1951) is a Swedish musician. He lives in Bjuråker in Hudiksvalls kommun.

Pontare was born in Arjeplog Municipality, and is of Sami descent. He has represented Sweden twice in the Eurovision Song Contest, in 1994 (duet with Marie Bergman) with "Stjärnorna" and in 2000 with "When Spirits Are Calling My Name", placing 13th and 7th, respectively. In 2018, he participated in the Swedish TV-show Stjärnornas stjärna broadcast on TV4.

Personal life
Roger Pontare is father to Viktor and Vincent Pontare. The latter is well known singer songwriter with the mononym Vincent and as Vargas as part of the duo Vargas & Lagola.

Discography

Albums

Singles

References

External links

1951 births
Melodifestivalen winners
Eurovision Song Contest entrants for Sweden
Eurovision Song Contest entrants of 1994
Eurovision Song Contest entrants of 2000
People from Arjeplog Municipality
Living people
20th-century Swedish male singers
Folk-pop singers
Symphonic rock musicians
Swedish Sámi musicians
20th-century Swedish male musicians
Melodifestivalen contestants of 2017
Melodifestivalen contestants of 2000
Melodifestivalen contestants of 1999
Melodifestivalen contestants of 1994